"The Whole Truth" is episode 50 of the American television anthology series The Twilight Zone. It originally aired on January 20, 1961 on CBS. It was one of the six episodes of the second season which was shot on videotape in a short-lived experiment aimed to cut costs.

Opening narration

Plot
The dealership of glib used-car salesman Harvey Hunnicut is visited by a mild-mannered elderly gentleman who offers to sell his vintage Model A car for a very low price. Though curious, Harvey accepts it, and only after the paperwork is signed and the ownership transferred does the older man admit that the antique contraption is haunted. Laughing this off, Hunnicut accepts the jalopy, intending to quickly unload it.

To his dismay, he realizes that he is no longer able to lie. He tells a young couple, prospective buyers, that all the cars on his lot are lemons and they should buy from a respectable dealership instead. When explaining to his wife why he's going to be home late, he openly states that he intends to play poker with his friends, which is what he always does when he tells her he is "doing inventory". When Irv, his employee, asks about the raise he was promised, Harvey confesses he always strings his workers along without ever giving raises. Irv punches out Harvey and quits.

Hunnicut concludes that his livelihood depends on his ability to rid himself of this supernatural burden. He's visited by Honest Luther Grimbley, a politician running for reelection, who shows interest in the haunted car despite its flaws. He nearly buys it, but Harvey is compelled to tell him about the car's curse, and Grimbley openly admits that he'd lose his job if he couldn't lie. When Harvey's brutally honest answer about the rest of the cars on the lot convinces Grimbley that the curse is real, he suggests selling the car to someone else who made a living on lies, showing him a newspaper story about the U.S. playing host to visiting Soviet leader Nikita Khrushchev. Surmising that, like every totalitarian state, the Soviet Union owes its existence to a tissue of lies, Hunnicut calls the Soviet embassy and convinces its representatives to visit his dealership. By being absolutely half-truthful, he sells the car as a potential anti-American propaganda tool, exemplifying shoddy, outdated U.S. automobile workmanship.

By the concluding scene, it seems that Hunnicut is about to change the course of history because the passenger watching the sale from the embassy limousine now has his name on paper as the haunted vehicle's owner. It appears to be none other than Khrushchev. Hunnicut telephones Washington, asking if he could possibly get in touch with "Jack Kennedy".

Closing narration

Cast
 Jack Carson as Harvey Hunnicut
 Loring Smith as Honest Luther Grimbley
 George Chandler as car-selling old man
 Jack Ging as young car buyer
 Nan Peterson as young car buyer's wife
 Arte Johnson as Irv
 Patrick Westwood as the premier's aide
 Lee Sabinson as the premier

Production
"The Whole Truth" was one of six Twilight Zone episodes shot on videotape instead of film in an attempt to cut costs. By November 1960, The Twilight Zones season two had already broadcast five episodes and finished filming 16. However, at a cost of about $65,000 per episode, the show was exceeding its budget. As a result, six consecutive episodes (production code #173-3662 through #173-3667) were videotaped at CBS Television City and eventually transferred to 16-millimeter film ["kinescoped"] for syndicated rebroadcasts. Total savings on editing and cinematography amounted to around $30,000 for all six entries, not enough to justify the loss of depth of visual perspective, which made the shows look like stage-bound live TV dramas (e.g. Playhouse 90, also produced at CBS). The experiment was deemed a failure and never attempted again.

John F. Kennedy was sworn in as the 35th president of the United States at the inaugural ceremonies held in Washington the afternoon of the day this episode originally aired. Jack Carson's final line was one of the rare times that a current president was actually mentioned during a Twilight Zone episode.

In the Twilight Zone radio drama adaption of this episode, the character of the Soviet premier was replaced with an emir from the Middle East.

See also
 List of The Twilight Zone (1959 TV series) episodes
 Liar Liar

References

DeVoe, Bill. (2008). Trivia from The Twilight Zone. Albany, GA: Bear Manor Media. 
Grams, Martin. (2008). The Twilight Zone: Unlocking the Door to a Television Classic. Churchville, MD: OTR Publishing.

External links

1961 American television episodes
The Twilight Zone (1959 TV series season 2) episodes
Cultural depictions of Nikita Khrushchev
Television episodes written by Rod Serling